Cleveland High School or CvHS is located in unincorporated Johnston County, North Carolina.  It lies within the Cleveland community, with a postal address of Clayton. It was established during the 2010–2011 school year. It is a public school which is part of Johnston County Schools. Cleveland High School was originally part of Cleveland School, which was founded in 1925 as an all-grade school. However, in 1969, due to the growth of student population in Johnston County, the high school grade students were moved to high schools throughout the county, including South Johnston High School. To account for the continued growth in Johnston County, two new schools, Cleveland High School and Corinth Holders High School, opened in 2010.

Notable alumni
 Kodi Whitley, Major League Baseball pitcher (Class of 2013)

References

Educational institutions established in 2010
Public high schools in North Carolina
Schools in Johnston County, North Carolina
2010 establishments in North Carolina